Paul J. Cambria, Jr. is an American criminal defense and appellate attorney, who has represented various figures and companies within the pornography industry as well as many prominent white collar defendants. Cambria received his Juris Doctor degree from the University of Toledo College of Law in 1973 where he graduated first in his class and a BA from the State University of New York at Fredonia in 1969. He has been named one of the best lawyers in America for over 25 consecutive years. He is the past president of the New York state criminal defense lawyers' associationand Past chair of the New York State bar Association criminal Justice section. He has argued before the United States Supreme Court. He is admitted to the bar in New York and California. D.C. and Pennsylvania.

A partner at the Buffalo-based law firm Lipsitz Green Scime Cambria, he practices in the areas of Criminal Trials, Appeals, Constitutional Law, First Amendment, Zoning, Antitrust, and Professional Licensing Defense. His practice is nationwide and he divides his time between the firm's offices in Buffalo and Los Angeles. He has represented nationally prominent figures including publisher Larry Flynt, musicians DMX and Marilyn Manson, Deputy A.J. Previty, NHL all-star Patrick Kane, and bio-artist Steve Kurtz, as well as local figures in Western New York such as Frank Parlato and Steve Pigeon.

As of 2019, Cambria is in negotiations to purchase Lancaster Speedway, a local stock car racing track. He is a member of the local chapter of Variety, the Children's Charity.

The Cambria List
After George W. Bush's 2000 election, there was concern within the pornography industry regarding possible future U.S. Justice Department prosecution over obscene material. In 2001, Cambria was commissioned by adult entertainment company Vivid Entertainment to create a list of sex acts that pornography film producers should avoid filming, in order to prevent possible legal problems with the U.S. government; it became known as "The Cambria List".

The PBS series Frontline in their program "American Porn" revealed some of the items on the list.

References

External links
 Cambria interview transcript from NPR's On the Media
 Coverage of the referenced Frontline episodes by Slate

New York (state) lawyers
Living people
Year of birth missing (living people)
People from Buffalo, New York